Nyavirus is a genus of negative-strand RNA viruses in the family Nyamiviridae. Ticks and  birds serve as natural hosts. There are four species in this genus.

History
Nyamanini nyavirus (NYMV) and Midway nyavirus (MDWV) were first isolated in 1957 and 1966 respectively. NYMV has been isolated from cattle egrets (species Bubulcus ibis) and ticks (species Argas walkerae) in Egypt, India, Nigeria, South Africa, and Thailand. MDWV has been isolated from tick of the genus Ornithodoros collected in Midway, Kure and Manana islands and northern Honshu, Japan. Antibodies to this virus have been found in the black-tailed gulls (species Larus crassirostris) and black-crowned night herons (species Nycticorax nycticorax).

Structure
Nyaviruses are enveloped, with spherical geometries. The diameter is around 100 to 130 nm. Genomes are linear, nonsegmented, and around 11.6 kbp in total length. The genome codes for 6 proteins. Their genomes contain six open reading frames. Of these, only two have been assigned a function: the putative nucleocapsid protein and RNA-dependent RNA polymerase.

Life cycle
Viral replication is nuclear. Entry into the host cell is achieved by attachment of the viral GP glycoproteins to host receptors, which mediates clathrin-mediated endocytosis. Replication follows the negative stranded RNA virus replication model. Negative stranded RNA virus transcription, using polymerase stuttering is the method of transcription. Progeny viruses are released by budding off from the host cell wall. Ticks and birds serve as the natural host.

Taxonomy
The genus has four species:

San Jacinto nyavirus
Midway nyavirus
Nyamanini nyavirus
Sierra Nevada nyavirus
Jeremy Point nyavirus

References

External links
 Viralzone: Nyavirus
 ICTV

Nyamiviridae
Virus genera